NETtalk is an artificial neural network. It is the result of research carried out in the mid-1980s by Terrence Sejnowski and Charles Rosenberg. The intent behind NETtalk was to construct simplified models that might shed light on the complexity of learning human level cognitive tasks, and their implementation as a connectionist model that could also learn to perform a comparable task.

NETtalk is a program that learns to pronounce written English text by being shown text as input and matching phonetic transcriptions for comparison.

The network was trained on a large amount of English words and their corresponding pronunciations, and is able to generate pronunciations for unseen words with a high level of accuracy. The success of the NETtalk network inspired further research in the field of pronunciation generation and speech synthesis and demonstrated the potential of neural networks for solving complex NLP problems.

The network is designed to handle the complexity of the English language, including its irregular spelling-to-sound relationships, and was trained in a purely unsupervised manner, without the use of any annotated data.

Achievements and limitations
NETtalk was created to explore the mechanisms of learning to correctly pronounce English text. The authors note that learning to read involves a complex mechanism involving many parts of the human brain. NETtalk does not specifically model the image processing stages and letter recognition of the visual cortex. Rather, it assumes that the letters have been pre-classified and recognized, and these letter sequences comprising words are then shown to the neural network during training and during performance testing. It is NETtalk's task to learn proper associations between the correct pronunciation with a given sequence of letters based on the context in which the letters appear. In other words, NETtalk learns to use the letters around the currently pronounced phoneme that provide cues as to its intended phonemic mapping.

References

External links 
Original NETtalk training set
New York Times article about NETtalk

Artificial neural networks
Speech synthesis